Salem Township is one of the thirteen townships of Wyandot County, Ohio, United States.  The 2010 census found 1,001 people in the township.

Geography
Located in the western part of the county, it borders the following townships:
Crawford Township - north
Tymochtee Township - northeast corner
Crane Township - east
Mifflin Township - south
Jackson Township - southwest corner
Richland Township - west
Ridge Township - northwest corner

No municipalities are located in Salem Township.

Name and history
It is one of fourteen Salem Townships statewide.

A 12 megawatt (MW) Wyandot Solar Facility solar photovoltaic power plant was completed in Salem Township in April 2010.

Government
The township is governed by a three-member board of trustees, who are elected in November of odd-numbered years to a four-year term beginning on the following January 1. Two are elected in the year after the presidential election and one is elected in the year before it. There is also an elected township fiscal officer, who serves a four-year term beginning on April 1 of the year after the election, which is held in November of the year before the presidential election. Vacancies in the fiscal officership or on the board of trustees are filled by the remaining trustees.

References

External links
County website

Townships in Wyandot County, Ohio
Townships in Ohio